The enzyme UDP-galacturonate decarboxylase catalyzes the chemical reaction

UDP-D-galacturonate  UDP-L-arabinose + CO2

This enzyme belongs to the family of lyases, specifically the carboxy-lyases, which cleave carbon-carbon bonds.  The systematic name of this enzyme class is UDP-D-galacturonate carboxy-lyase (UDP-L-arabinose-forming). Other names in common use include UDP-galacturonic acid decarboxylase, UDPGalUA carboxy lyase, and UDP-D-galacturonate carboxy-lyase.  This enzyme participates in nucleotide sugars metabolism.

References

 

EC 4.1.1
Enzymes of unknown structure